Hyperdrive is a futuristic racing video game made by Midway Games and released in arcades in 1998. Nintendo 64, Dreamcast, and PlayStation ports were planned but were cancelled.

Gameplay
Players race high-tech ships through race tracks stationed in outer space. The lower the ships hover in relation to the track, the faster they go.

There are three tracks to race on and four different ships available.

Development
Hyperdrive uses the same 3Dfx-based board as Midway's earlier game NFL Blitz, but with a faster processor.

The arcade version of the 1999 game Hydro Thunder utilizes the same basic cabinet as Hyperdrive.

References

1998 video games
Arcade video games
Arcade-only video games
Cancelled Nintendo 64 games
Cancelled Dreamcast games
Cancelled PlayStation (console) games
Science fiction racing games
Midway video games
Video games developed in the United States